The Cormier-Village hayride accident occurred in the Canadian rural community of Cormier-Village, New Brunswick,  west of Cap-Pelé and  east of Shediac.

Accident
On the afternoon of Sunday, October 8, 1989, the members of the McGraw and Leger families were participating in a hayride, travelling in a wagon pulled by a farm tractor, as well as two following pickup trucks, along the shoulder of Route 945.

The driver of a tractor trailer (logging truck) hauling a 6-tonne load of hardwood logs cut into  lengths lost control as he passed, resulting in the entire load of logs tipping onto the tractor/wagon and pickup trucks.  13 people were killed and 45 injured with many victims pinned and crushed; five children were among those who died.

Emergency responders from the RCMP in Shediac, volunteer fire fighters from Cap-Pelé and numerous ambulance paramedics from across Westmorland County responded.

Response 
The horror of this accident, both for survivors and emergency responders, resulted in the Government of New Brunswick forming a provincial Critical Incident Stress Management Team.

References

Hay Wagon - Truck Collision Kills 12 (Associated Press) 9 October 1989

Road incidents in Canada
Westmorland County, New Brunswick
1989 in Canada
1989 road incidents
1989 in New Brunswick
Accidental deaths in New Brunswick
October 1989 events in Canada